Stands may refer to:

The Stands, an English rock band
スタンド Sutando, a visual manifestation of life energy (JoJo's Bizarre Adventure)
Bleachers, a seating or standing (terracing) areas at a sports venue (American)
an alternative term for a kiosk
Stands for Decibels, the 1981 debut album by The dB's
Speaker stands, furniture on which to place speakers

See also
Stand (disambiguation)